Mahan Rural District (Dehestān-e Māhān) is a rural district (dehestan) in Mahan District, Kerman County, Kerman Province, Iran. At the 2006 census, its population was 3,364, in 886 families. The rural district has 41 villages.

References 

Rural Districts of Kerman Province
Kerman County